is a public junior college in Kamigyō-ku, Kyoto, Japan. The junior college opened in 1993, and closed in 2005. The predecessor of the school was founded in April 1889.

Academic departments
 Nursing

Advanced courses
 Public Health Nurse
 Midwifery

See also 
 Kyoto Prefectural University of Medicine

References

External links
  

Japanese junior colleges
Universities and colleges in Kyoto Prefecture
Educational institutions established in 1993
Educational institutions disestablished in 2005
1993 establishments in Japan
2005 disestablishments in Japan